The Blantyre Raid was an attack carried out by the rebel leader John Chilembwe and his followers on the African Lakes Company depot in Blantyre on 24 February 1915. The rebels failed to capture the depot, although they were able to seize a small number of rifles from the depot.

Background
The rebels cut the Zomba–Tete and Blantyre–Mikalongwe telephone lines, delaying the spread of the news of their revolt to the government and Governor of Nyasaland.

The Raid
The African Lakes' Company weapons store in Blantyre was raided by a force of around 100 rebels at around 02:00pm on 24 January, before the general alarm had been raised by news of the Magomero and Mwanje attacks. The defenders mobilised after an African watchman was shot dead by the rebels. The insurgents were repulsed, but not before they had captured five rifles and some ammunition, which was taken back to Mbombwe. 

A number of rebels were taken prisoner during the retreat from Magomero.

References

Bibliography

 
 
 

Chilembwe uprising